Joe Bennett may refer to:
 Joe Bennett (dancer) (1889–1967), American eccentric dancer
 Joe Bennett (baseball) (1900–1987), American Major League player
 Joe Bennett (American football) (1901–1975), American football and basketball player
 Joe Bennett (1940–2015), American rock and roll singer, songwriter, and guitarist, leader of Joe Bennett & the Sparkletones
 Joe Bennett (artist) (born 1968), Brazilian comic book penciller
 Joe Bennett (musician) (born 1969), British musician
 Joe Bennett (writer) (born 1957), New Zealand writer
 Joe Bennett (footballer) (born 1990), English footballer for Cardiff City

See also
 Joe Bennet Aldert (1889–1967),  vaudeville dancer
 Joseph Bennett (disambiguation)